Alfyorovka is a rural locality (a selo) in Novokhopyorsk, Novokhopyorsky District, Voronezh Oblast, Russia. The population was 713 as of 2010. There are 6 streets.

Geography 
Alfyorovka is located 21 km north of Novokhopyorsk (the district's administrative centre) by road. Zamelnichny is the nearest rural locality.

References 

Populated places in Novokhopyorsky District